is a series of video games published by Nintendo since 1981 and created by game designer Shigeru Miyamoto. 

Donkey Kong and Mario have both had the roles of protagonist and antagonist in the series. Other characters have included other Kongs, the crocodilian villain King K. Rool, and supporting animal characters. This article only lists the characters that have appeared in titles that include "Donkey Kong" or "DK".

Kongs
Kongs are a group of various primates (particularly apes and monkeys) that live on Donkey Kong Island. The Kong Family (also known as the Kong Klan and the DK Crew) is a group led by Donkey Kong comprising his family and friends. They have numerous non-Kong allies who appear throughout the series, and are commonly antagonized by the Kremling Krew, who steal their valuables (and sometimes kidnap members of the Kong family) to further their nefarious goals.

Donkey Kong's family

Donkey Kong (original)/Cranky Kong

Game appearances
Donkey Kong, also known as DK, is a male gorilla. The first character named Donkey Kong is introduced in the original 1981 arcade game as the computer-controlled antagonist who abducts Pauline. The player must take the role of Mario and rescue her. Donkey Kong is held captive by Mario in Donkey Kong Jr. In Donkey Kong 3, he terrorises a greenhouse. In the Game & Watch game Donkey Kong Hockey, he served as a playable character for the first time. 

In 1994's Donkey Kong Country, a new, different-looking Donkey Kong was introduced, said to be the grandson of the original arcade character, who is now the elderly  (also known as Donkey Kong Sr.), a grumpy elderly gorilla, known for his scathing fourth wall-breaking commentary. He has appeared as Cranky Kong in a number of Donkey Kong games, primarily as a boastful adviser to Donkey Kong and his various simian friends (in-game and in the instruction manuals), as well as running minigames and tutorials. His main purpose in Donkey Kong Country is to distribute helpful hints about the game's many stages to the modern Donkey Kong and his sidekick Diddy Kong whenever they drop by his cabin. Donkey Kong Country 2 saw him play a similar role, although this time the player would have to provide enough banana coins to buy specific hints. In Donkey Kong Country 3: Dixie Kong's Double Trouble!, he is the player's opponent in a throwing mini game at Swanky's Sideshow; in the GBA versions of Donkey Kong Country 2 and Donkey Kong Country 3, he hosts several minigames, and is briefly playable in the Dojo minigame of the latter. Donkey Kong 64 sees Cranky deal out potions that grant each of the five playable Kongs special abilities and can be purchased at Cranky's Lab. He also hosts the Jetpac game, and will grant the player access to it in exchange for 15 Banana Medals. Cranky has also made cameo appearances in Super Smash Bros. Melee, Super Smash Bros. Brawl, Super Smash Bros. for Nintendo 3DS and Super Smash Bros. Ultimate on the Jungle Japes stage, as well as appearing in Donkey Konga and its sequels. He made appearances dispensing tips in DK: King of Swing and DK: Jungle Climber. He is playable in Donkey Kong Barrel Blast. In Donkey Kong Country Returns and its 3DS remake, he runs various shops that sell items and helps the player by giving hints and tips when they leave his shop. In Donkey Kong Country: Tropical Freeze, Cranky becomes playable in the main campaign of a Donkey Kong platformer for the first time. His moveset is based around his cane, which allows him to bounce on spikes.

Characteristics
The original Donkey Kong is a large, enraged gorilla, which Miyamoto said was "nothing too evil or repulsive", and Mario's pet. Miyamoto has also named "Beauty and the Beast" and the 1933 film King Kong as influences for the character. The name was derived by Miyamoto from "stubborn ape": Miyamoto used "donkey" to convey "stubborn" in English; while "Kong" was simply to imply him being a "large ape." 

Donkey Kong Country portrays Cranky as the original Donkey Kong character featured in the 1981 arcade game. The character retains his stubborn nature and has become an aged, sharp-minded, and disparaging video game veteran who throughout the games distributes advice and useful items. 64 portrays him as an alchemist. He is currently voiced by Takashi Nagasako. As his name implies, Cranky is perpetually bitter about many things and complains about them to anyone who gives him even the slightest acknowledgment. He is mostly angry about the state of modern video games, once going so far as to complain about how many bits and bytes are used up to simply animate his swinging beard. Every time he sees any such thing he seems to fondly recall his heyday in which he was an 8-bit character.

In other media
The Saturday Supercade is the character's first role in a television series. In it, Donkey Kong (voiced by Soupy Sales) has escaped from the circus and Mario (voiced by Peter Cullen) and Pauline (voiced by Judy Strangis) are chasing the ape. As with the original game, Donkey Kong will often grab Pauline and Mario has to save her.

Cranky was a regular on the Donkey Kong Country animated series. He is still as bitter as in the games, but without his fourth wall-breaking comments. His cabin is where the Crystal Coconut, a mystical artifact that predicted DK would become the future ruler of Kongo Bongo Island (as DK Island was called on the series), is kept. Often, Cranky mixes potions, somewhat prefiguring his Donkey Kong 64 role. He was voiced by Aron Tager, and by Ryūsei Nakao in the Japanese dub of the TV series.

A 2007 documentary, The King of Kong: A Fistful of Quarters, chronicles the competitive following for the arcade version of Donkey Kong.

The original arcade version of Donkey Kong is the last villain of the 2015 film Pixels.

Cranky Kong will appear in the upcoming animated film The Super Mario Bros. Movie, voiced by Fred Armisen.

Donkey Kong Jr.

 also known as DK Jr. or simply Junior, is the protagonist of the 1982 arcade game of the same name and the son of the original Donkey Kong. Junior wears a white singlet with a red letter "J" on it. His objective in the game is to save his father, who was locked by Mario in a cage. He returns in the 1994 Game Boy game Donkey Kong, where he teams up with his father, who has kidnapped Pauline, against Mario. Junior also appeared as a playable character in Super Mario Kart, but was absent in later installments until he returned in the "Super Mario Kart Tour" in Mario Kart Tour, he also appeared in the Virtual Boy game Mario's Tennis, and as a hidden character in the Nintendo 64 version of the similarly named Mario Tennis. He also has his own educational video game for the Nintendo Entertainment System: Donkey Kong Jr. Math. Other appearances by Junior include the Game & Watch games Donkey Kong Jr. (in wide-screen, tabletop and panorama versions) and Donkey Kong II, as well as the Game & Watch Gallery series compilations for Game Boy. He also appears as the physical appearance of the transformed king of World 4 in the Super NES and Game Boy Advance versions of Super Mario Bros. 3. Donkey Kong Junior had his own segment in the first season of Saturday Supercade and was voiced by Frank Welker. Like his father, he had his own cereal brand in the 1980s.

Donkey Kong Jr. Math features a character with pink fur named "Junior (II)". This character's nature as metafictional or otherwise is not stated.

Shortly before the release of Donkey Kong 64 in 1999, Leigh Loveday, the writer of Donkey Kong Country 2, stated that, as far as he knew, the modern Donkey Kong who appears in Donkey Kong Country onward is a grown-up version of Junior himself. However, the manual for Donkey Kong Country, Donkey Kong Land, Donkey Kong Country 2: Diddy's Kong Quest, stated that Cranky is the original Donkey Kong and is the grandfather of the game's titular character. More recently, Super Smash Bros. Brawl, Super Smash Bros. Ultimate, Donkey Kong Country Returns, Donkey Kong Country: Tropical Freeze and Gregg Mayles of Rare have stated that the current Donkey Kong is the original Donkey Kong's grandson.

The character Diddy Kong was going to be an updated version of Donkey Kong Junior, but Nintendo did not like this idea, suggesting either to give him his old look or make him a new character. Rare chose the latter and Diddy Kong was made.

Donkey Kong (modern)

The new, redesigned Donkey Kong introduced as the main player character in 1994's Donkey Kong Country was said to be the grandson of the original arcade character, who was now the elderly Cranky Kong, Cranky having relinquished his name to him. However, in Donkey Kong 64, Cranky repeatedly refers to the current Donkey Kong as his son. This was reverted to the original grandson relationship in subsequent games such as the Game Boy Advance versions of Donkey Kong Country and Donkey Kong Country 2: Diddy's Kong Quest, Super Smash Bros. Brawl, and Donkey Kong Country Returns. Diddy Kong is the modern DK's nephew. In Yoshi's Island DS, Mario and DK are both babies and two of the Seven Star Children. While Candy Kong is his girlfriend, in the manual for Mario vs. Donkey Kong 2: March of the Minis, he is described as falling in love with Pauline at first sight.

The modern Donkey Kong is used for the antagonist role typical of the original Donkey Kong in the Mario vs. Donkey Kong series and a playable character in many Mario spin-off games

Donkey Kong will appear in the upcoming animated film The Super Mario Bros. Movie, voiced by Seth Rogen. In November of 2021, there were reports that stated Illumination had begun development on a Donkey Kong spin-off film, with Rogen set to reprise his role.

Diddy Kong

Diddy Kong, also known as Diddy, is a young male spider monkey, the secondary main protagonist of the Donkey Kong franchise, Donkey Kong's sidekick and nephew. His first appearance was Donkey Kong Country. In the game's storyline, Donkey Kong requested for him to protect their Banana Hoard overnight, while he takes a nap. While guarding the bananas, Diddy was captured by the Kremlings and sealed in a barrel afterwards. Having heard the news, Donkey Kong sets off on his adventure, frees Diddy, and they both confront King K. Rool. The duo manage to defeat him, and recover their stolen bananas along the way.

In Donkey Kong Country 2: Diddy's Kong Quest, Donkey Kong has been kidnapped by Kaptain K. Rool, and Diddy must team up with Dixie Kong to save him. After rescuing DK and defeating K. Rool, K. Rool retreats to his secret island, the Lost World. The Kongs defeat K. Rool a second time, knocking him into Crocodile Isle's generator, which explodes. The Kongs escape the island and witness its destruction.

Later on, both Diddy and DK get captured in Donkey Kong Country 3: Dixie Kong's Double Trouble!, and the newly named Baron K. Roolenstein uses them as a power source for KAOS, a giant robot to spy on Dixie and Kiddy Kong's adventure in rescuing the apes. Diddy and Donkey Kong are eventually freed by Dixie and Kiddy.

King K. Rool returns in Donkey Kong 64; he gets his minions to imprison Donkey Kong's friends, with Diddy being one of them. He attempts to steal the Banana Hoard again. As soon as Diddy is freed from his imprisonment, he can collect red bananas, red coins, play his electric guitar, charge at foes or objects, fly in his barrel jet pack, and shoot peanuts from his guns.

Diddy Kong also appeared in Donkey Kong Country Returns, its 3DS remake and Donkey Kong Country: Tropical Freeze. He is one of the main characters of the television series adaptation. He has many roles in the Mario games, including basketball, kart racing and many more.

Wrinkly Kong
 is an elderly gorilla and the wife of Cranky Kong. Wrinkly first appeared in the game Donkey Kong Country 2: Diddy's Kong Quest for the SNES, where she ran Kong Kollege. She gave the player advice and allowed the player to save their game. She appeared again in Donkey Kong Land 2, and again in Donkey Kong Country 3: Dixie Kong's Double Trouble!. This time, she resided in 'Wrinkly's Save Cave', where the player could both save their game and deposit Banana Birds, which were found throughout the game. This concept remained sans birds in Donkey Kong Land III, where she resided in 'Wrinkly Refuge'. In the Game Boy Advance version of Donkey Kong Country 3, Wrinkly was portrayed as a spiritual follower of the Banana Birds.

Wrinkly next appeared in Donkey Kong 64. She has apparently died at some point after Donkey Kong Land III as she is now a ghost. Every world lobby in the game, with the exception of Hideout Helm, featured five doors with Wrinkly's face on them; each door presented a hint for the level that applied to the Kong that corresponded to the door color (yellow for Donkey Kong, red for Diddy Kong, blue for Lanky Kong, purple for Tiny Kong, and green for Chunky Kong). When the player begins meeting her in Donkey Kong 64, she says, "Don't be afraid of me, young ones! It's only me, Wrinkly Kong" and then she gives the player advice on how to win a Golden Banana on the corresponding level.

Her first playable appearance was in DK: King of Swing and would later return for DK: Jungle Climber, and as an unlockable character in Donkey Kong Barrel Blast. She was voiced by Miho Yamada. She also appears as a trophy in Super Smash Bros. Brawl and Super Smash Bros. for Wii U.

Dixie Kong's family

Dixie Kong
 is a young female chimpanzee or monkey with a prehensile ponytail. Her first appearance is Donkey Kong Country 2: Diddy's Kong Quest where she and Diddy Kong partner as "inseparable friends" to rescue DK. Cranky refers to her as "that girlfriend of his". She was also playable in Donkey Kong Land 2.

Dixie later was the protagonist of Donkey Kong Country 3: Dixie Kong's Double Trouble! and Donkey Kong Land III, with Kiddy Kong as her sidekick. While she did not return in Donkey Kong 64, her sister, Tiny Kong, served as her replacement. 

Her next playable appearance was in Donkey Konga 2 on the Nintendo GameCube, a bongo rhythm game. She appeared once again in the Japan-only Donkey Konga 3. She is also a playable character in DK: King of Swing for the Game Boy Advance, Diddy Kong Racing DS and DK: Jungle Climber for the Nintendo DS, Donkey Kong Barrel Blast for the Wii.

Dixie Kong is also available as a playable character in Mario Superstar Baseball, this was also Dixie Kong's debut in the Mario franchise. Her next appearance in a Mario game was in Mario Hoops 3-on-3. She later appeared in Mario Super Sluggers. Additionally, she made her debut appearance in the Mario Kart series in Mario Kart Tour for mobile phones.

After 6 years of not appearing in games since Mario Super Sluggers, she returned in Donkey Kong Country: Tropical Freeze for the Wii U and Nintendo Switch.

Dixie appears in the Donkey Kong Country TV series, where she was voiced by actress Louise Vallance. She is currently voiced by Kahoru Sasajima.

Kiddy Kong
Later online errata described him as age three and Dixie's "little cousin". as well as the younger brother of Chunky Kong. Their mission is to solve a series of mysteries in the Northern Kremisphere and find their missing friends Donkey Kong and Diddy Kong. His abilities include water skipping, being able to roll farther to make longer than average jumps, and throwing Dixie high out of normal jump reach, with Dixie being able to throw him and guide his fall to break platforms and unveil hidden secrets.

Kiddy Kong is also playable in Donkey Kong Land III, where he joins Dixie in her quest to prove herself worthy by finding the fabled Lost World before DK, Diddy, and the Kremlings. He does not appear in Donkey Kong 64, but is mentioned in the manual as being the baby brother of Chunky Kong. He appeared as a racer in the trailer for the cancelled Donkey Kong Racing. He has yet to make a playable appearance in any new original games since. In Super Smash Bros. Ultimate, he appears as part of Dixie Kong's upgraded collectible "spirit".

Tiny Kong
 is a young, female chimpanzee who first appeared in Donkey Kong 64. She has blonde hair with pigtails. She is Dixie Kong's younger sister and is a cousin to Chunky Kong and Kiddy Kong, as stated in the manual for Donkey Kong 64.

In Donkey Kong 64, her clothing is a beanie hat, blue overalls, a white T-Shirt, and white shoes. She is freed by Diddy Kong in the 'Angry Aztec' level in the building near Candy's Music Shop. Her weapon is the Feather Crossbow and her instrument is the 'Saxophone Slam'. The Potion enables her to perform 'Mini-Monkey', 'Pony-Tail Twirl', and 'Monkey-Port'. She can shrink when she jumps into her special barrel, allowing her access to areas other Kongs cannot go. She can do a helicopter-spin, equivalent to Dixie's, to slow down her descent.

Tiny was one of the confirmed characters in Donkey Kong Racing for the Nintendo GameCube with Donkey Kong, Diddy, Kiddy, and Taj the Genie, but the game was canceled as Microsoft purchased Rare in September 2002.

She makes a cameo appearance in the Game Boy Advance ports of the Super NES games Donkey Kong Country 2: Diddy's Kong Quest and Donkey Kong Country 3: Dixie Kong's Double Trouble!. In Donkey Kong Country 2, Diddy, Dixie, or both must rescue her from the Zingers in a mini-game called Kongnapped, in which the objective is to rescue six of her in order to win. In Donkey Kong Country 3, she appears in one of Funky's Motorboat challenges. These two games are the only games where she is not a playable character.

In her spin-off debut, Diddy Kong Racing DS, she seems to have grown more mature, being both taller and more physically developed than her sister, Dixie. Her clothing now consists of a beanie hat, sweat pants, a midriff-revealing spaghetti-strap top, sandals and fur wristbands, as well as earrings that she did not wear in the previous games. She is one of the first eight playable characters. Her acceleration and handling are slightly below average, and she has a medium top speed.

Donkey Kong Barrel Blast is the first game on the Wii that she appears in. She is unlocked by completing Sapphire Mode on a Rookie Setting as one of the Kongs. She was voiced by Kahoru Sasajima.

Tiny Kong is also available as a playable character in Mario Super Sluggers, her debut in the Mario franchise.

She later makes a cameo appearance in Super Smash Bros. Ultimate as a Spirit using her artwork from Donkey Kong 64.

Chunky Kong
 is a large gorilla weighing 2,000 pounds and is one of the playable Kongs in the game Donkey Kong 64 where he is the largest of the playable Kongs. Chunky is the older brother of Kiddy Kong and cousin of Dixie Kong and Tiny Kong. He is freed by Lanky in the level Frantic Factory. Before he is freed, he indicates that he does not like heights. Despite his brawny build, he acts somewhat cowardly and childish and lacks some intelligence, indicated by his speaking in third-person broken English. During the attract mode to Donkey Kong 64, all the Kongs are shown in the manner of a hip hop video. Chunky Kong is dressed in a flare-legged disco outfit with an afro hairstyle, but immediately realizes this is out of style (or out of place for rap) and runs off, immediately returning wearing more appropriate clothes. When in the spotlight on the character select screen, he panics and asks the player to choose his cousin Tiny. His weapon is the 'Pineapple Launcher', and his instrument is the 'Triangle Trample'. The potion enables him to perform 'Hunky Chunky', turning gigantic, 'Primate Punch', unleashing a very powerful punch that can smash down some doors and walls, and 'Gorilla-Gone', temporarily turning him invisible. He can carry boulders and other heavy items that the other Kongs cannot. It is Chunky, with a combination of the 'Hunky Chunky' and 'Primate Punch' abilities, who ultimately defeats K. Rool in the last boxing match in Donkey Kong 64.

He makes a brief cameo appearance in the Game Boy Advance remake of Donkey Kong Country 3 in the third challenge of Funky's Rentals, where he is one of the Kongs that he has to be rescued from the Kremlings' kidnapping, along with other characters such as Candy, Tiny and Cranky Kong.

In Donkey Kong Barrel Blast, his weapon called the 'Pineapple Launcher' is an item that can be obtained in an item balloon and follows the player ahead of him until it hits them.

He appears as a sticker in Super Smash Bros. Brawl. In Super Smash Bros. Ultimate, he appears as a Spirit using his artwork from Donkey Kong 64.

Other gorillas

Candy Kong
 is a female gorilla and Donkey Kong's girlfriend. Candy Kong first appeared in Donkey Kong Country providing save point stations throughout the game. Her second appearance was in Donkey Kong 64; Candy was redesigned, now wearing a bikini and some sneakers.

She also makes a brief appearance in DK: King of Swing, and is seen cheering on the player characters. She wears a pink bikini top and short shorts, and her torso was redesigned (this appearance has remained in subsequent games). In the GBC and GBA remakes of Donkey Kong Country Candy runs challenges and a dance studio respectively. She also makes brief cameo appearances in the GBA remakes of Donkey Kong Country 2: Diddy's Kong Quest and Donkey Kong Country 3: Dixie Kong's Double Trouble!.

In the Game Boy Advance remake of Donkey Kong Country 2 she appears as a model and assistant on Swanky Kong's quiz show, and she wore a purple dress.

She also made a brief appearance in Donkey Kong Barrel Blast in the mode Candy's Challenges and allowed the players to collect up to a total of 1,000 bananas and to win the tracks in first place. She and Swanky Kong are the only two protagonist Kongs who have yet to become playable. She was going to be one of the playable characters in Diddy Kong Pilot, replacing Redneck Kong, but that game was cancelled after Microsoft Game Studios bought Rare.

In a 1995 manga from Comic BomBom, Mario sees Candy wearing a swimsuit and a mask concealing her species, and is infatuated by her.

Candy was also a regular on the Donkey Kong Country animated series, voiced by Joy Tanner. Instead of being blonde as seen in the games, she has fiery red hair. She works at a barrel factory run by "Bluster Kong", her boss. This version of Candy also has a very quick temper. 

She is voiced by Satsuki Tsuzumi in video games.

Funky Kong
 is a cool surfer and mechanic gorilla. Initially, he allows the Kongs to go back to worlds they have previously completed. However, in Donkey Kong Country 3: Dixie Kong's Double Trouble!, he takes on a different role as a vehicle merchant, allowing Dixie Kong and Kiddy Kong to reach new worlds in the game. In Donkey Kong 64, Funky has switched jobs yet again to become the ammunitions expert of the group, his business seeming to suggest an army surplus store. He supplies various weapons and upgrades to the Kongs, donning camouflage clothing, goggles and a large rocket on his back (which is revealed near the end of the game to contain a giant boot) in favor of his old board shorts and sunglasses. He takes back on his surfer appearance in later games. He is also a playable character in Donkey Kong Barrel Blast, as well as in multiplayer modes of Donkey Konga 3, DK: King of Swing and DK: Jungle Climber. He is currently voiced by Toshihide Tsuchiya.

Funky is also a regular on the Donkey Kong Country animated series, where he was voiced by Damon D'Oliveira. One difference is that the cartoon version of Funky has tan fur as opposed to the brown fur his video game portrayal has. He was also given a Jamaican accent. Like in the games, Funky is keen on surfing and runs his own airline service. He often talks about karma and is the best dancer on the island. Funky is not fond of adventuring or fighting the Kremlings, nor is he keen on doing very much work; he often tries to take the easier way out of a situation, or just leave it up to DK and Diddy.

Funky resurfaces in Donkey Kong Country: Tropical Freeze as the keeper of the Fly and Buy shops, thus taking over the role of shopkeeper from Cranky Kong, who instead becomes a playable character. In the Nintendo Switch enhanced port of Tropical Freeze, Funky also serves as a playable character, headlining the eponymous "Funky Mode" exclusive to that port. In Funky Mode, characters can play as Funky Kong, who has extra health and other perks such as double-jumping and standing on spikes without taking damage. Players can switch between Donkey Kong and Funky while playing in Funky Mode, but Donkey Kong and his partner will both have added health. A save file cannot be changed out of Funky Mode once it has been started.

Outside of the Donkey Kong games, Funky also appears as an unlockable heavyweight character in Mario Kart Wii. He is widely considered to be the best character in the game, due to his speed bonus statistic. His next appearance in a Mario game was in Mario Super Sluggers for the Wii, where he was a playable character along with the other Donkey Kong characters. Funky uses his surfboard as a bat in the game. In Super Smash Bros. Ultimate, he runs a shop in the game's story mode and can be unlocked as a spirit. Additionally, he appears as a playable character in Mario Kart Tour.

Swanky Kong
 is a gorilla and an entrepreneur. He first appears as the game show hosts a TV show called "Swanky's Bonus Bonanza" in Donkey Kong Country 2: Diddy's Kong Quest in which Diddy and Dixie must answer questions about the game correctly to win extra lives. The questions range from easy ones such as enemies and worlds featured in the game to more difficult ones such as objects in the background of levels.

After Crocodile Isle is destroyed in Donkey Kong Country 2, Swanky runs "Swanky's Sideshow" in the Northern Kremisphere of Donkey Kong Country 3: Dixie Kong's Double Trouble!. Swanky gives Bear Coins and Banana Bunches as rewards for winning. In Donkey Kong Country 2, he wears a blue oversized jacket and has an afro hair style. In Donkey Kong Country 3, he wears a white long-sleeved shirt, a gold vest, a bowler hat, black pants, black and white shoes, and has a diamond-topped cane.

In the Game Boy Advance version of Donkey Kong Country 2, Swanky's role remains the same except that he now has Candy as his assistant. Upon completing all of his quizzes, Swanky will reward the player with a photo of himself to add to the scrapbook. In the GBA version of Donkey Kong Country 3 (his last appearance), Swanky sports his Donkey Kong Country 2 look and now runs "Swanky's Dash", a virtual reality game where stars are collected as Dixie (as Kiddy is too young to play). If enough stars are collected, Swanky will give the player Bear Coins, Banana Bunches, and Extra Life Balloons. Swanky Kong, like Candy Kong, has never been a playable character. His relationship to the Kong Family is unknown.

Orangutans

Manky Kong
In Donkey Kong Country, enemy orangutans known as Manky Kong appear. They attack the protagonists by throwing barrels. The game's manual describes the Manky Kongs as "Kong reject orangutans."

Lanky Kong
 is a buffoonish orangutan who is a distant cousin to the Kong family. Lanky's first appearance was in Donkey Kong 64 as one of the game's five playable Kongs. He is freed by Donkey Kong in the 'Angry Aztec' level in the Llama's Temple. His weapon is the 'Grape Shooter', his instrument is the 'Trombone Tremor', and the potion enables him to perform 'OrangStand', where he walks on his hands to climb steep slopes, 'Baboon Balloon', which allows him to inflate himself to reach higher areas, and 'OrangSprint', which allows him to run fast on his hands. In the level 'Gloomy Galleon', he can transform into Enguarde the Swordfish when he enters the Enguarde Crate. Lanky Kong is known for his lack of style and grace, as well as his funny face.

Lanky appears in his spin-off debut Donkey Kong Barrel Blast (2007) as one of the unlockable characters, which marks his last physical appearance. He was voiced by Kentaro Tone.

The likeness of Lanky Kong appears as a trophy in Super Smash Bros. Brawl and Super Smash Bros. for Wii U, as well as a collectible Spirit in Super Smash Bros. Ultimate.

Fruit Kingdom Kings
The Fruit Kingdom Kings are a group of Kongs from Donkey Kong Jungle Beat who rule their respectful territoris in the Fruit Kingdoms and have invaded Donkey Kong's home turf. DK must battle these Kongs by using conventional fighting methods, like punching and kicking.

Ghastly King
Ghastly King, the head of the group, is a giant, shadowy Kong-like figure who serves as the ruler of the Fruit Kingdoms. It is implied that he put a spell on the other Evil Kings in order to defeat DK. After Ghastly King is defeated, DK becomes the new ruler of the Fruit Kingdoms and Dread Kong, Karate Kong, Ninja Kong, and Sumo Kong accept his leadership and congratulate him.

Dread Kong
Dread Kong is the ruler of the Banana Kingdom who sports dreadlocks and uses punch attacks. He is the weakest of the four Kongs controlled by Ghastly King.

After appearing in Jungle Beat, Dread Kong reappears in Donkey Kong Jungle Fever and Donkey Kong Banana Kingdom, the two medal games based on Jungle Beat.

Karate Kong
Karate Kong is the ruler of the Pineapple Kingdom who is an expert at karate.

After appearing in Jungle Beat, Karate Kong reappears in Jungle Fever and Banana Kingdom. He also appears as a Spirit in Super Smash Bros. Ultimate. His Spirit is represented by Ryu from the Street Fighter series.

Ninja Kong
Ninja Kong is the ruler of the Durian Kingdom who is a practitioner of ninjitsu.

After appearing in Jungle Beat, Ninja Kong reappears in Jungle Fever and Banana Kingdom. In Super Smash Bros. Ultimate, Ninja Kong appears as a Spirit that is embodied by Donkey Kong.

Sumo Kong
Sumo Kong is the ruler of the Star Fruit Kingdom who is an expert sumo wrestler. He is the largest and strongest of the four Kongs controlled by Ghastly King.

After appearing in Jungle Beat, Sumo Kong reappears in Jungle Fever and Banana Kingdom.

Humans

Mario

He was the antagonist in Donkey Kong Jr., and further appeared as playable in Donkey Kong Hockey.

He returns as a platforming protagonist in Mario vs. Donkey Kong and is ostensibly the one controlling the Mini-Mario toys in its sequels.

Pauline

She also appeared in the 1994 Game Boy game of the same name as well as Mario vs. Donkey Kong 2: March of the Minis and its sequels. Pauline is the earliest example of a female with a speaking role in a video game, and is cited as a famous example of a damsel in distress in fiction. In 2017, Super Mario Odyssey marked her debut in the Super Mario series, serving as the mayor of New Donk City. Since then, she has appeared in several other Mario titles.

Stanley
, sometimes called Stanley the Bugman, is an exterminator and the protagonist of Donkey Kong 3. Stanley has only made one other prominent appearance as the protagonist of the Game & Watch game Greenhouse, in which he sprays worms attacking his plants. Greenhouse was re-released in Game & Watch Gallery 3, but the modern version stars Yoshi instead. Stanley also appears in Donkey Kong 3 microgames in both WarioWare: Twisted! and WarioWare: Touched! and a trophy of him can be obtained in the game Super Smash Bros. Melee. He also appeared in the Saturday Supercade cartoon.

Kremlings
 are an advanced crocodilian species native to Crocodile Isle. Examples of Kremlings include Kritter, which demonstrate a variety of behaviours and ability to use tools, Klaptrap, which is small and quadrupedal, and Krockhead, which is more primitive and always submerged in swamps or lava. They come in many sizes, varieties, and colors. The Kremlings live on Crocodile Isle, and as typical of crocodiles, favour swamps. All of their names begin with the letter K, with the exception of Skidda and Bazuka from Donkey Kong Country 3.

The Kremling Krew is a powerful organization of evil Kremlings, led by King K. Rool, that antagonize the Kongs. This group is composed of commanders (Klump, Kasplat and Kalypso), strong bodyguards (Krusha, Kudgel and Klubba) and troops (Kritters and Klaptraps). Many different animal species (birds, mammals, insects, fish, other reptiles, etc.) reinforce K. Rool and his army. When Crocodile Isle is destroyed, the organization comes into crisis, with Kremling remnants building several bases in the Northern Kremisphere until they are regrouped by KAOS (which is K. Rool acting in the shadows).

All the Kremlings are part of the Kremling Krew that antagonizes the Kongs with exception of K. Lumsy, who opens up levels for the Kongs in Donkey Kong 64.

The Kremlings were originally conceived for a game called Jonny Blastoff and the Kremling Armada, an unreleased point & click adventure game that predated Donkey Kong Country.

King K. Rool

King K. Rool is a hot-tempered, authoritarian and baleful green Kremling who is the main antagonist of many Donkey Kong games and has been Donkey Kong and Diddy Kong's archenemy ever since Donkey Kong Country. His name is a pun on the word cruel. He is an unhinged pirate who builds various sophisticated inventions and is constantly switching personae. The despotic king of Kremlings, he constantly antagonizes the Kongs, referring to them as "filthy apes", "monkey brains" and "ludicrous lemurs" as well as frequently stealing Donkey Kong's banana hoard. His most distinguishing features are the tic in his left eye, his red cape, his gold crown and wrist bands, and his yellow belly or alternatively golden armor with an outie navel. His tail seems to change size or disappear completely between appearances. While overweight, K. Rool has huge muscles in his arms and he has proven to have enormous brute strength that matches (perhaps surpasses) both Donkey Kong and Chunky Kong in power. K. Lumsy is his younger brother.

While K. Rool's crown-and-cape look has been his typical appearance since Donkey Kong Country, he takes on alternate disguises and personalities to battle the Kongs in other games:

 He is the pirate Kaptain K. Rool who kidnaps and imprisons Donkey Kong in Donkey Kong Country 2.
 He later takes the alias of the mad scientist Baron K. Roolenstein who tries to take over the Northern Kremisphere in Donkey Kong Country 3. While doing so, he creates a distraction of a machine called KAOS to observe the Kongs' progress throughout the game.
 He is the boxer King "Krusha" K. Rool in Donkey Kong 64. This game also features Gloomy Galleon, which features a sunken ship bearing pictures of his previous alias Kaptain K. Rool. It is unknown whether or not this is "Gangplank Galleon", the ship in Donkey Kong Country 2.

In the TV series, he is the main antagonist and is portrayed as somewhat pompous with a Posh accent.

He is voiced by Chris Sutherland in Donkey Kong 64, Benedict Campbell in the Donkey Kong Country animated series, Jūrōta Kosugi in the Japanese adaptation of the show, and by Toshihide Tsuchiya in other video games. 

K. Rool also appeared in Mario Super Sluggers (his first appearance in a Mario game) as an unlockable character along with DK, Diddy, and Funky, as well as one of his Kritters. He uses his magical sceptre as a bat.

In Super Smash Bros. Melee and Super Smash Bros. Brawl, K. Rool appeared as a collectible trophy. A Mii Fighter costume based on K. Rool's design appears in Super Smash Bros. for Nintendo 3DS and Wii U as downloadable content. K. Rool made his long-awaited debut as a playable Super Smash Bros. fighter in Super Smash Bros. Ultimate.

Klump
 are large, rotund members of the Kremling Krew and appear as King K. Rool's second-in-command in various Donkey Kong games.Donkey Kong 64 Instruction Booklet, Nintendo, 1999, p. 5 Leading the Kremling Krew army in Donkey Kong Country, a Klump is ordered by K. Rool to steal the Banana Hoard from underneath Donkey Kong's Treehouse, which was being protected by Diddy Kong. After Klump knocks out Diddy with his "enormous bulk", he instructs the Kremlings to stuff Diddy in a barrel and take off with the bananas.Donkey Kong Country Player's Guide, Nintendo, 1994, p. 88 Klump's main outfit is a green military helmet with three yellow chevrons, a green belt with five pockets, and black boots with white shoelaces. Due to their helmets, they are invincible to Diddy's jump; however, Diddy can defeat them with his cartwheel attack, or by throwing a barrel at them. Unlike Diddy, all of DK's attacks can defeat them in a single hit.

According to the manual for Donkey Kong Country 2: Diddy's Kong Quest, the Klumps appear as their pirate alter-ego Kannon. In this game, they wear earrings, a large belt, pirate boots, a black eye patch and a large black hat with a human skull and crossbones. They are armed with a cannon that allows them shoot barrels and "Kannonballs" (forward or downward). Without their helmets, Klumps are now vulnerable to Diddy and Dixie Kong's attacks.

In Donkey Kong 64, Klumps reappear and are depicted as much larger enemies with a pink coloration. They attack by throwing green unripe Orange Grenades at the Kongs, and the only way to defeat them is by using a shockwave attack or by throwing an Orange Grenade of the Kongs' own. When defeated, they give out a salute and fall over. In the game's introduction sequence, a Klump is ordered by King K. Rool to distract Donkey Kong by stealing the Golden Bananas and kidnapping the Kong Family so that K. Rool can repair his Blast-O-Matic weapon.

A single Klump appears as a playable character in Donkey Kong Barrel Blast. Klump now wears a bucket on his head, and has a brown skin coloration. He shares stats with his rival Lanky Kong. Klump was slated to appear as a playable character in another racing game, the second iteration of Diddy Kong Pilot, which redone as Banjo-Pilot after Rare was acquired by Microsoft. He was replaced with Klungo.

In the Donkey Kong Country animated series, Klump serves as King K. Rool's second-in-command and is referred to as General Klump, voiced by Adrian Truss, and by Keiichi Sonobe in the Japanese dub. Originally depicted with a tough military-like exterior, Klump actually has quite the soft side to his personality, as seen by him befriending Dixie Kong in the episode "Klump's Lumps". His skin color is also different compared to the games, with him sporting varying shades of green between seasons.

Krusha
 are blue Kremlings known for their supreme strength. Due to their strength, only Donkey Kong can defeat them in Donkey Kong Country and Donkey Kong Land. They appear in 2 in pirate gear as Krunchas'''. Like the previous game, they cannot be defeated with regular attacks, and attempting to attack them will result in Kruncha becoming enraged. They can only be defeated with an animal friend, a crate, a barrel or with Diddy and Dixie teaming-up. Krunchas also appear unchanged in Donkey Kong Country 2s pseudo-sequel Donkey Kong Land 2. Krushas do not appear in Donkey Kong Country 3: Dixie Kong's Double Trouble!, but similar enemies known as Krumples appear in their place.

Krusha appears as a secret playable multiplayer character in Donkey Kong 64. He has an orange grenade launcher, and he has a sliding ability, similar to Tiny Kong. Similar enemies known as Kasplats appear in the main game. While Krusha does not appear in Donkey Kong Barrel Blast, a similar blue skinned character by the name Kludge does appear. In the US version of Super Smash Bros. Brawl, Krunchas and Krumples are mentioned in Kludge's trophy description.

In the Donkey Kong Country animated series, Krusha appears as King K. Rool's bodyguard, voiced by Len Carlson.

Kritter
 are common enemies in the Donkey Kong franchise and are the main foot soldiers of the Kremling Krew. In the first Donkey Kong Country game, they are usually seen either walking or jumping. Kritters known as Krash appear riding minecarts in the minecart stages. As their name suggests, they are hazards that try to crash into the player.

As with most of the Kremlings in Donkey Kong Country 2: Diddy's Kong Quest, Kritters are dressed as pirates and outfitted with peg legs. Those who walk are named Klomp and have one peg, while the jumpers are named Kaboing and have two. The Kritters in Donkey Kong Country 3: Dixie Kong's Double Trouble! lack clothing. The walkers are called Kobble and the jumpers named Koil bounce on their spring-loaded tails.

A single leather jacket-wearing Kritter known as Krunch appears as a playable character in Diddy Kong Racing. In Donkey Kong 64, Kritters are redesigned and appear sporting similar leather jackets to Krunch, as well as belt buckles with skulls on them. Two specific Kritters are seen piloting K.Rool's Mechanical Island, chasing after one of the Kongs, and serving as referees during the final battle. Krashes also reappeared in Donkey Kong 64, but they were redesigned to be much more muscular, wielding clubs to smack the Kongs with. Skeletal and robotic variants of Kritters also appear in Donkey Kong 64.

In DK: King of Swing, Kritters appear as enemies in the main game mode and as a playable character in the game's multiplayer mode. King of Swing would mark the debut of their current muscular design. Kritters appear mostly unchanged in the game's sequel, DK: Jungle Climber. A single Kritter appears as racer in Donkey Kong Barrel Blast, sharing the same balanced stats as his rival Donkey Kong.

They would make their Mario franchise debut as spectators in Mario Power Tennis. In the Mario Strikers series, a Kritter serves as a goalie for each team. A Robo-Kritter serves as the goalie for a robotic team in Super Mario Strikers. In Mario Super Sluggers, Kritters appear as playable characters and members of the DK Wilds team.

Kritters appeared as trophies in Super Smash Bros. Brawl, Super Smash Bros. for Nintendo 3DS and Super Smash Bros. for Wii U, as well as stickers in Brawl. They also appeared as enemies in the 3DS exclusive Smash Run mode, with Green Kritters attacking by biting three times in a row, while Blue Kritters attack by spinning around furiously with their claws.

They also appear in the Donkey Kong Country animated series as King K. Rool's soldiers.

Klaptrap
 or Klap Traps are recurring enemies in the Donkey Kong games. They closely resemble the enemy known as Snapjaw from the arcade game Donkey Kong Jr. They appear as small crocodiles with large mouths and come in a variety of colors, but most commonly blue. Similar enemies known as Klampons and Krimps appear in Donkey Kong Country 2: Diddy's Kong Quest and Donkey Kong Country 3: Dixie Kong's Double Trouble! respectively.

Klaptraps would appear as stage hazards and as a collectable trophy in Super Smash Bros. Melee, they would reprise their role as stage hazards in future games in the Super Smash Bros. series, as well as becoming Assist Trophies in Super Smash Bros Ultimate. They would also appear as hazards and enemies in certain Mario spin-offs, such as Mario Power Tennis, Mario Superstar Baseball and Mario Party 7.

Klaptraps also appear in the Donkey Kong Country animated series. A large Klaptrap known as Jr. Klap Trap or simply Jr. appears as a minor character in the TV series, voiced by Ron Rubin.

Recurring baddies
Animals and other enemies called "baddies" appear throughout the franchise. 

 Oil Drum - In the original game, Country, Land, and Mario vs Donkey Kong 2: March of the Minis, Oil Drums produce fire and enemies that can harm the player character. Country also features an Oil Drum boss named Dumb Drum. 
 Nitpicker - NitpickersInstruction manual for Atari 7800 port of Donkey Kong Jr. or simply "Birds" appear in Donkey Kong Jr., Donkey Kong Jr. Math, Donkey Kong for Game Boy, March of the Minis, and Minis March Again.
 Snapjaw - Snapjaws are anthropomorphic metal foothold traps with a powerful bite first appearing as vine-climbing enemies in Donkey Kong Junior. In Captain N: The Game Master, they have the outer appearance of piranhas, which carries into their appearance in Country 2. The character (spelled "Snap Jaw") appears in a past setting in Yoshi’s Island DS, climbing vines and only featuring in stages with Baby DK. Klaptrap is visually similar to the original incarnation of Snapjaw. 
 Gnawty - Gnawty is a beaver that appears in Donkey Kong Country, Donkey Kong Land, Donkey Kong 64 and Banjo-Kazooie. Very Gnawty and Really Gnawty are bosses. Analogous rat enemies Neek and Sneek appear in the rest of Rare's Donkey Kong platformers.
 Army - Army is an armadillo that appears in Donkey Kong Country, Donkey Kong Land, and as a boss in Donkey Kong 64.
 Necky - Neckies are vultures that appear in Country, Land, Country 2, Land 2, King of Swing, Jungle Climber and Barrel Blast. Master Necky, Master Necky Snr., Krow, and Kreepy Krow are bosses.
 Zinger - Zingers are hornets from a large and complex hive on Crocodile Isle. They appear in Country, Land, Country 2, Land 2, and 64. Their monarchs are the bosses Queen B and King Zing.

Introduced in Diddy Kong Racing

Diddy Kong Racing (1997) for the Nintendo 64 introduced several characters to the Donkey Kong franchise, some of which have appeared in other games by Rare. While Nintendo lost intellectual property rights to some of them in 2002, estranging them from Donkey Kong, they reappear in the Nintendo DS remake Diddy Kong Racing DS in 2007, except Banjo and Conker, who were replaced by Dixie and Tiny.

 Timber - Timber is a tiger whose parents go on holiday to Donkey Kong Island and leave him in charge of their home, Timber's Island, prompting Timber and his friends to organize a race. This is interrupted when a sinister intergalactic pig-wizard named Wizpig arrives at Timber's Island and attempts to take it over after having conquered his own planet. Timber hires a team of eight racers: Diddy Kong, Conker, Banjo, Krunch, Tiptup T.T., Pipsy, and Bumper to defeat Wizpig. Timber later establishes a hip-hop career. Timber was originally intended to be the main protagonist of a fourth entry of the R.C. Pro-Am series, titled Pro-Am 64. Miyamoto suggested adding Diddy Kong to the game and making him the main character.
 Drumstick - Drumstick, a rooster and the best racer on Timber's island, is transformed into a frog by Wizpig's magic. After Wizpig is defeated, Drumstick is turned back into a rooster and unlocked as a racer. 
 Conker - Conker the Squirrel debuted in Diddy Kong Racing as a promotion for his future titles. After the release of Conker's Pocket Tales (1999) for Game Boy Color, his previously announced N64 game was retooled for an older audience. Rare reimagined Conker as a fourth-wall breaking alcoholic armed with guns and knives. The game, Conker's Bad Fur Day, was released in 2001. In 2002, Microsoft acquired Rare, causing Nintendo to lose the rights to the character. In a later exegesis in reference to Diddy Kong Racing, Conker states that "Things were different back then, you know, I was different - it goes without saying that you wouldn't catch me hanging out with any of those freaks these days."
 Banjo - Banjo is a bear recruited by Diddy. Banjo made his debut as a playable character as part of the cast of Diddy Kong Racing. Banjo-Kazooie was released in 1998 and was followed by three sequels and a spin-off racing game. Microsoft acquired the Banjo franchise in 2002 as part of Rare. In 2019, Banjo and his friend Kazooie were revealed as part of the first Fighter Pass for Super Smash Bros. Ultimate in a trailer set at Donkey Kong's treehouse, acknowledging Banjo's origins in the Kongs' world. 
 Krunch - Krunch is a Kremling and Diddy's enemy, who follows after him. The rights to Krunch were kept by Nintendo in the Microsoft acquisition.
 Tiptup - Tiptup is a turtle with a nervous personality who lives on Timber's Island. Tiptup reappears in Banjo-Kazooie inside "Tanktup's Shell" in Bubblegloop Swamp with his own choir. Tiptup can also be found in Banjo-Tooie in the Turtle View Cave in Jolly Roger's Lagoon. He states that he has nineteen daughters; Banjo-Tooie depicts the birth of his first son. Tiptup also makes a cameo appearance in Banjo-Pilot, where he can be found in Clanker's River.
 T.T. - T.T. is a living stopwatch who lives on Timber's Island and is in charge of the race courses.
 Pipsy - Pipsy is a mouse who lives on Timber's Island. The design of Pipsy was originally intended for the main character of a game called Astro Mouse, which was cancelled. This character was redesigned by Kevin Bayliss and included in Diddy Kong Racing as Pipsy.
 Bumper - Bumper is a badger who lives on Timber's Island. In May 2012, Bumper is serving time in prison. He later makes parole, and is superficially remorseful for his actions.
 Taj - Taj is an Indian elephant-like genie residing on the island who aids Diddy and his friends. He is a playable racer in Diddy Kong Racing DS.
 Tricky - Tricky is a Triceratops who is one of Timber's Island's four guardians. He is the first boss in Diddy Kong Racing. A character named Prince Tricky in Star Fox Adventures was originally intended to be the same character as the Tricky in Diddy Kong Racing. Nintendo now owns the rights to the Prince Tricky incarnation of the character.
 Wizpig - The extraterrestrial wizard Wizpig is the main antagonist in Diddy Kong Racing. He is a giant pig from the planet Future Fun Land who seeks to conquer an island Wizpig turns the island's four guardians (Tricky the Triceratops, Bluey the Walrus, Bubbler the Octopus and Smokey the Dragon) into his henchmen. Ultimately, the rocket he rides on malfunctions and launches him to the moon. However, an additional cutscene reveals Wizpig's spaceship flying through the sky, unscathed. He is a playable racer in Diddy Kong Racing DS.

Tiki Tak Tribe
The Tiki Tak Tribe are a primitive group of evil Tikis who are the antagonists in Donkey Kong Country Returns and its 3DS remake. The Tiki Tak Tribe use hypnosis-inducing music on the animals of Donkey Kong Island (namely elephants, giraffes, zebras, and squirrels) and steal bananas, even from Donkey Kong, forcing him to retrieve the hoard with the help of Diddy Kong. The Tiki Tak Tribe's hypnotic music does not work on DK or Diddy. 

Tiki Tong
The tribe is led by Tiki Tong, a gigantic Tiki with a wooden crown, red eyes, demonic horns, a large mouth, and a carved nose. Before the final battle against Tiki Tong, it is revealed that the Tikis use bananas as an energy source; Tiki Tong generates a pair of hands by consuming bananas and spewing the juice onto his Tiki minions.

Tiki GoonsTiki Goons are the most common members of the Tiki Tak Tribe. They make a cameo appearance in Mario Kart 7 on the track DK Jungle where they attack players and make them drop coins. They reappear in Mario Kart 8 and Mario Kart 8 Deluxe, performing the same function. Several different Tikis appear as collectible trophies in Super Smash Bros. for Nintendo 3DS and Wii U, as well as a group 'Tiki Tak Tribe' Spirit in Super Smash Bros. Ultimate.

Snowmads
The Snowmads are a group of hegemonic and aggressive arctic animals that are the main antagonists of Donkey Kong Country: Tropical Freeze. They are a group of Vikings that have invaded Donkey Kong Island. Most of the Snowmads wear horned helmets on their heads. Their invasion prompts Donkey Kong, Diddy Kong, Dixie Kong, and Cranky Kong to band together in order to reclaim Donkey Kong Island. In Super Smash Bros. for Nintendo 3DS and Wii U, several members of the Snowmad army appear as collectible trophies.

Lord FredrikLord Fredrik, the Snowmad King is a large obese anthropomorphic walrus who uses his enchanted blowing horn to throw the entire island into a state of perpetual winter. He appears as a Spirit in Super Smash Bros. Ultimate that is embodied by King K. Rool.

Lord Fredrik's name in European French	is Sire Frighorrifik (corruption of "frigorifique," meaning "refrigerated"), in German Seine Frostigkeit König Qual ("His Frostiness King Torment"), in Italian Renaldo, il re dei Ghiacci	Reynold ("the King of Ices"), and in Spanish Frigorico I, el Rey Morsario ("Frigorico I, the Corsair-Walrus King"). Frigorico here is a portmanteau of frigo, meaning "fridge," and the given name Frederico. Morsario is a play on morsa, meaning "walrus," and corsario, meaning "corsair."

Pompy the PresumptuousPompy the Presumptuous is a sea lion serving Lord Fredrik.

Skwol the StartlingSkowl the Startling is an owl serving Lord Fredrik.

Ba-Boom the BoistourousBa-Boom the Boistourous are a trio of baboons collectively known by this name who serve Lord Fredrik.

Fugu the FrighteningFugu the Frightening is a pufferfish serving Lord Fredrik as his underwater agent.

Bashmaster the UnbreakableBashmaster the Unbreakable is a polar bear serving Lord Fredrik who wields a war hammer.

Snowmad soldiers
Among the known foot soldiers of the Snowmads are:

 Fluff - Enemy rabbits.
 Hootz - Enemy snowy owls.
 Lemmington - Lemmings that ride spiked wheels.
 Tuck - Enemy penguins.
 Waldough - Enemy walruses.

Support characters
Animal FriendsAnimal Friends, also known as the Animal Buddies, Amicable Animals, and Jungle Buddies, are friendly animals who the Kongs can ride, transform into, or have perform various tasks. Among the known animal friends are:

 Rambi - An Indian rhinoceros who originated in Donkey Kong Country, where he can ram through enemies and walls. Rambi is also featured in Land, Country 2, Land 2, 64, Barrel Blast, Returns and Tropical Freeze. Baby rhinos strongly resembling Rambi called RamRams appear in Mario vs. Donkey Kong. In Mario Kart DS, Donkey Kong's first exclusive kart, the Rambi Rider, has Rambi's head on it.
 Expresso - A sneaker-wearing ostrich who originated in Country and can run fast. He can also fly for a short amount of time. Expresso is also featured in Land and a minigame in the Game Boy Advance re-release of Country 2.
 Winky - A frog who appears in Donkey Kong Country and can jump higher than the Kongs and defeat more types of enemies with his jump attacks.
 Enguarde - A swordfish with a thrust attack who appears in all of Rare's Donkey Kong platformers except Land, also appearing in Barrel Blast and Tropical Freeze.
 Squawks - A parrot who, in all of Rare's platformers except Donkey Kong Country and Land, can carry Kongs upward and over obstacles. In the platformers starring Diddy or Dixie, he can spit eggs, which can defeat most enemies. In Country and 64 he carries a spotlight to increase visibility in dark levels. Squawks appears as a usable item in Barrel Blast, Returns, and Tropical Freeze.
 Squitter - A sneaker-wearing spider who originated in Country 2. His abilities include shooting webs that defeat enemies and enemy projectiles, and creating web platforms to walk on to cross gaps and avoid hazards. Squitter was also featured in Land 2, Country 3, and Land III. 
 Rattly - A rattlesnake who originated in Country 2. Rattly can coil up and bounce high, and the Kongs can also ride him.
 Clapper - A seal who originated in Country 2. His arctic breath can cool and freeze water.
 Glimmer - A bioluminescent anglerfish who originated in Country 2. Like Squawks in the previous DKC game, it can shine a spotlight to increase visibility in dark underwater levels.
 Quawks - A parrot who originated in Country 2. He is a blue counterpart of Squawks that cannot spit eggs or fly upwards, being only able to carry the Kongs in a slow descent while avoiding obstacles. He reappears in Country 3 where he is now dark purple and gains the ability to fly anywhere and pick up and throw barrels. Quawks is also featured as a usable item in Barrel Blast.
 Ellie - An African elephant who originated in Country 3. She can carry barrels and squirt water that she sucks up. Ellie is afraid of mice like  so the Kongs must have her pick up a barrel and toss it at the mice to eliminate them. In later games, Ellie does not have a fear of mice.
 Parry - A pheasant-like Parallel Bird who originated in Country 3. Once found, he flies above wherever the players go, collecting out-of-reach objects. He can also defeat certain enemies, such as "Booty Birds", but is vulnerable to others like the mechanical "Buzzes".
 Lightfish - A tadpole-like fish that originated in DK64. It has a light that shines when the Kongs are in the shipwrecks in Gloomy Galleon.
 Hoofer - A wildebeest who originated in Jungle Beat. Like Rambi, Hoofer can ram into barriers and enemies.
 Orco - An orca who originated in Jungle Beat. Like Enguarde, Orco can smash through underwater barriers and enemies.
 Helibird - Helibirds are duck-like hovering birds that originated in Jungle Beat.
 Flurl - A flying squirrel who originated in Jungle Beat. 
 Helper Monkeys - (also known as Party Monkeys) are monkeys that help Donkey Kong on his quest in Jungle Beat.
 Professor Chops - (referred to as Tutorial Pig in Returns) is a pig who appears in Returns and Tropical Freeze. He serves as a middle-gate to save Donkey Kong's progress in a level. If DK loses most of his lives, the professor offers his help to complete the level. Also, he gives tips and tricks while Donkey Kong is near an obstacle as well as giving tips to the Kongs.
 Whale - An unnamed sperm whale who originated in Returns. It only appeared in the level "Blowhole Bound" where Donkey Kong and Diddy Kong free it from an anchor and it gives them a ride along the shores of Donkey Kong Island.
 Tawks - A red parrot who originated in the Nintendo Switch version of Tropical Freeze. He replaces Funky Kong at Funky's Fly 'n' Buy whenever he is journeying with the other Kongs.

Brothers Bear
The Brothers Bear are a race of anthropomorphic bears who live in the Northern Kremisphere in Donkey Kong Country 3: Dixie Kong's Double Trouble! There are 15 of them located throughout the Northern Kremisphere. In order of appearance:

 Bazaar - Bazaar is a brown bear who runs a general store in the Northern Kremisphere. He has the most dialogue out of the Brothers Bear. He mentions having met Link once.
 Barnacle - Barnacle is a grizzly bear that lives on an island in the middle of Lake Orangatanga. He is a former scuba diver. In the GBA version, he was moved to Pacifica.
 Brash - Brash is a boastful brown bear that lives in Kremwood Forest. He is an athlete who is at his happiest when he is undefeated in a sport.
 Blunder - Blunder is a grizzly bear that lives in a booth (library in the GBA remake) within Kremwood Forest. In his rude ramblings, he often lets clues slip to where the Lost World of Krematoa can be found.
 Bramble - Bramble is a brown bear that lives in a cabin near Cotton Top Cove. He is a botanist who has an interest in plants and flowers.
 Blue - Blue is a blue bear who lives in a beach house in Cotton Top Cove. He has a sad personality, especially when he claims that no one came to his birthday party. The Kongs manage to give him a birthday present that Blizzard has them deliver.
 Brigadier Bazooka - Brigadier Bazooka is a grizzly bear who lives in his barracks on Mekanos Island. He is an old war veteran who fought in the Kremean War. His prized possession is a huge cannon named Big Bessie. 
 Blizzard - Blizzard is a polar bear (in the Game Boy Advance remake, he's a grizzly bear) who lives in a base camp at the top of K3 and is best friends with Blue.
 Barter - Barter is a brown bear who lives in his shop near K3.
 Benny - Benny is a polar bear who operates one of the chairlifts at Razor Ridge. He is the twin brother of Björn.
 Björn - Björn is a polar bear who operates one of the chairlifts at Razor Ridge. He is the twin brother of Benny.
 Baffle - Baffle is a brown bear who lives in his code room in KAOS Kore.
 Boomer - Boomer is a grizzly bear who lives in his bomb shelter in Krematoa. He is a demolition expert and only collects Bonus coins.
 Bear - Bear is a black bear who is exclusive to Donkey Kong Land III. He runs a Sheepy Shop in each location.
 Bachelor - Bachelor is a brown bear who is exclusive to the Game Boy Advance version of Donkey Kong Country 3 and lives on an island at the center of Lake Orangatanga.

Snide the WeaselSnide is a weasel who originated in Donkey Kong 64. He was once King K. Rool's chief technician who had invented the Blast-O-Matic and other devices that the Kremlings have used. King K. Rool fired him due to a paranoia that Snide was going to betray him. Snide moved to Donkey Kong Isle where he set up his headquarters. He aids the Kongs by giving them blueprints to the Kremling devices.

Troff and ScoffTroff the Pig and Scoff the Hippopotamus' are animals who originated in Donkey Kong 64''. When Scoff is fed a specific amount of bananas, he will lift Troff to reach the key to the boss door.

See also
 List of Mario characters
 List of Super Smash Bros. characters

Notes

References

Donkey Kong Characters